Lisa Marten is an American politician currently serving as the Hawaii state representative for Hawaii's 51st district. She is a member of the Agriculture committee, Energy and Environmental Protection committee, and the Finance committee. Marten is a member of the Hawaiian Caucus, the Womenʻs Caucus, the Keiki Caucus, the Kupuna Caucus and the Progressive Legislative Caucus.

References

Pitzer College alumni
Columbia University alumni
Harvard Kennedy School alumni
Year of birth missing (living people)
Living people
Democratic Party members of the Hawaii House of Representatives